Oh, What a Night is a 1935 British comedy film directed by Frank Richardson and starring Nina Boucicault, James Carew and Valerie Hobson. It was a quota quickie made at Wembley Studios.

Cast
 Nina Boucicault as Althea Gregory  
 James Carew as Mortimer B. Gregory  
 Valerie Hobson as Susan  
 Kathleen Kelly as Miss Wyley  
 Molly Lamont as Pat  
 Stanella Perry 
 Ernest Stidwell as Dawson  
 Roland Culver

References

Bibliography
 Low, Rachael. Filmmaking in 1930s Britain. George Allen & Unwin, 1985.
 Wood, Linda. British Films, 1927-1939. British Film Institute, 1986.

External links

1935 films
1935 comedy films
Films directed by Frank Richardson
British comedy films
Films set in England
Films shot at Wembley Studios
Quota quickies
British black-and-white films
1930s British films